The 2009 Toronto FC season was the third season in Toronto FC's existence. The club narrowly missed their first appearance for the MLS playoffs, losing the last game of the season when a win would have meant qualification.

Club

Management

Kits

Squad
As of September 9, 2009.

Transfers

In

Out

Competitions
Updated to games played October 24, 2009.

Regular season

Standings

Results summary

Results by round

Matches

Pre-season

Carolina Challenge Cup 2009

2009 Major League Soccer season

2009 Canadian Championship

CONCACAF Champions League 2009-10

Preliminary Round

Mid-season friendlies

Squad statistics
Competitive matches only. Numbers in brackets indicate appearances as a substitute.
Updated to games played October 24, 2009.

Players

Goalkeepers

Disciplinary record 
Only players with at least one card included.

1Player is no longer with team

References

2009
Toronto Fc
Toronto Fc
Toronto FC